Khan Muhammad Chah railway station is a railway station at Khan Mohammadchah, Iran. It is one of three Pakistan Railways stations in Iran.

See also
 List of railway stations in Pakistan
 Pakistan Railways

References

External links

Railway stations in Iran
Railway stations on Quetta–Taftan Railway Line